The women's team pursuit competition at the 2020 European Speed Skating Championships was held on 12 January 2020.

Results
The race was started at 14:15.

References

Women's team pursuit